The  Rain or Shine Elasto Painters season was the 15th season of the franchise in the Philippine Basketball Association (PBA).

Key dates
March 14: The PBA Season 46 draft was held at the TV5 Media Center in Mandaluyong.

Draft picks

Roster

 

  also serves as Rain or Shine's board governor.

Philippine Cup

Eliminations

Standings

Game log

|-bgcolor=ccffcc
| 1
| July 16
| NLEX
| W 83–82
| Rey Nambatac (19)
| Rey Nambatac (8)
| Beau Belga (5)
| Ynares Sports Arena
| 1–0
|-bgcolor=ccffcc
| 2
| July 18
| Blackwater
| W 71–62
| Rey Nambatac (21)
| Mocon, Nambatac (12)
| Mocon, Norwood (3)
| Ynares Sports Arena
| 2–0
|-bgcolor=ccffcc
| 3
| July 24
| Meralco
| W 85–72
| Javee Mocon (18)
| Beau Belga (10)
| Javee Mocon (6)
| Ynares Sports Arena
| 3–0
|-bgcolor=ffcccc
| 4
| July 28
| Alaska
| L 48–74
| Adrian Wong (9)
| Javee Mocon (10)
| Mocon, Nambatac, Ponferada (2)
| Ynares Sports Arena
| 3–1
|-bgcolor=ffcccc
| 5
| July 30
| TNT
| L 69–79
| Javee Mocon (22)
| Norbert Torres (11)
| Javee Mocon (3)
| Ynares Sports Arena
| 3–2

|-bgcolor=ccffcc
| 6
| August 1
| Terrafirma
| W 83–77
| Rey Nambatac (17)
| Javee Mocon (9)
| Beau Belga (5)
| Ynares Sports Arena
| 4–2

|-bgcolor=ffcccc
| 7
| September 2
| Phoenix
| L 77–78
| Belga, Mocon (17)
| Javee Mocon (12)
| Gabe Norwood (5)
| DHVSU Gym
| 4–3
|-bgcolor=ffcccc
| 8
| September 8
| Barangay Ginebra
| L 77–83
| Rey Nambatac (18)
| Mark Borboran (7)
| Javee Mocon (5)
| DHVSU Gym
| 4–4
|-bgcolor=ccffcc
| 9
| September 10
| Magnolia
| W 75–72
| Javee Mocon (19)
| Javee Mocon (8)
| Beau Belga (3)
| DHVSU Gym
| 5–4
|-bgcolor=ccffcc
| 10
| September 12
| San Miguel
| W 95–93
| Leonard Santillan (21)
| Javee Mocon (12)
| Anton Asistio (7)
| DHVSU Gym
| 6–4
|-bgcolor=ffcccc
| 11
| September 19
| NorthPort
| L 88–91 (OT)
| Jewel Ponferada (17)
| Javee Mocon (11)
| Javee Mocon (6)
| DHVSU Gym
| 6–5

Playoffs

Bracket

Game log

|-bgcolor=ffcccc
| 1
| September 26
| Magnolia
| L 70–81
| Leonard Santillan (17)
| Leonard Santillan (12)
| Beau Belga (6)
| DHVSU Gym
| 0–1
|-bgcolor=ffcccc
| 2
| September 30
| Magnolia
| L 86–96
| James Yap (16)
| Belga, Santillan (6)
| Beau Belga (5)
| DHVSU Gym
| 0–2

Governors' Cup

Eliminations

Standings

Game log

|-bgcolor=ccffcc
| 1
| December 9
| Blackwater
| W 92–79
| Henry Walker (20)
| Javee Mocon (9)
| Belga, Mocon (4) 
| Ynares Sports Arena
| 1–0
|-bgcolor=ffcccc
| 2
| December 11
| Terrafirma
| L 106–112 (OT)
| Nambatac, Walker (25)
| Henry Walker (12)
| Gabe Norwood (9)
| Ynares Sports Arena
| 1–1
|-bgcolor=ccffcc
| 3
| December 16
| Phoenix
| W 90–88
| Rey Nambatac (17)
| Leonard Santillan (10)
| Beau Belga (6) 
| Smart Araneta Coliseum
| 2–1
|-bgcolor=ffcccc
| 4
| December 19
| Magnolia
| L 98–109
| Nambatac, Walker (23)
| Henry Walker (6)
| Belga, Mocon, Nambatac (6)
| Smart Araneta Coliseum
| 2–2
|-bgcolor=ffcccc
| 5
| December 26
| TNT
| L 92–95
| Henry Walker (32)
| Henry Walker (9)
| Caracut, Nambatac (4)
| Smart Araneta Coliseum
| 2–3

|-bgcolor=ccffcc
| 6
| February 12, 2022
| NorthPort
| W 104–90
| Mike Nieto (21)
| Henry Walker (11)
| Henry Walker (10)
| Smart Araneta Coliseum
| 3–3
|-bgcolor=ffcccc
| 7
| February 17, 2022
| Alaska
| L 74–80
| Henry Walker (25)
| Henry Walker (13)
| Gabe Norwood (5)
| Smart Araneta Coliseum
| 3–4
|-bgcolor=ffcccc
| 8
| February 20, 2022
| Meralco
| L 88–93
| Henry Walker (24)
| Borboran, Mocon, Walker (10)
| Javee Mocon (6)
| Smart Araneta Coliseum3,347
| 3–5
|-bgcolor=ffcccc
| 9
| February 25, 2022
| NLEX
| L 100–109 (OT)
| Henry Walker (28)
| Henry Walker (13)
| Gabe Norwood (5)
| Ynares Center
| 3–6

|-bgcolor=ffcccc
| 10
| March 3, 2022
| San Miguel
| L 100–104
| Henry Walker (23)
| Henry Walker (10)
| Nambatac, Walker (5)
| Smart Araneta Coliseum
| 3–7
|-bgcolor=ffcccc
| 11
| March 6, 2022
| Barangay Ginebra
| L 93–104
| Henry Walker (34)
| Henry Walker (8)
| Andrei Caracut (4)
| Smart Araneta Coliseum6,502
| 3–8

Transactions

Free agency

Signings

Trades

Pre-season

Mid-season

Recruited imports

References

Rain or Shine Elasto Painters seasons
Rain or Shine Elasto Painters